Two Toasters is a mobile design and development company based in North Carolina, with offices in New York. They provide iOS and Android application development and strategy.

History

Two Toasters was founded by Rachit and Adit Shukla, along with three friends, in 2008 following the launch of Apple's App Store.

In their first few years, the company worked with other tech startups and with large firms on mobile development and strategy. They developed apps for Airbnb, Dick's Sporting Goods, and GateGuru (now owned by TripAdvisor). More recently, Two Toasters developed apps for Regal Cinemas, Fat Wallet, and JackThreads.

In December 2014 the company moved to its current location in the American Tobacco Historic District after expanding its staff. In January 2015 Gigaom reported that the company is developing an "Ara Manager" Android app for Google.

On March 31, 2015, Two Toasters announced it was acquired by Ticketmaster, and changed its name to Ticketmaster Mobile Studio.

As of October 23, 2019 Ticketmaster Mobile Studio's Twitter, Facebook, GitHub, and LinkedIn pages are deleted, and Google reports their main office at 318 Blackwell St. is permanently closed.

Awards and honors
Two Toasters has won a 2014 Webby award for the Birchbox iOS app  and was ranked 787 on the 2014 Inc. 5000 list of companies

References

2008 establishments in North Carolina
Defunct companies based in North Carolina